The Cathedral Basilica of the Good Lord Jesus (also Metropolitan Cathedral Basilica of the Good Lord Jesus or Cuiabá Cathedral) is a Catholic church with basilica status, located in the city of Cuiabá, capital of the state of Mato Grosso in Brazil.

Built in 1723, initially with wattle and daub (wood and lianas with mud), the mother church of Cuiabá, dedicated to the Good Lord Jesus, was rebuilt in rammed earth between 1739 and 1740, while the first bell tower dates from 1769. It became the seat of the prelature on December 6, 1745, and was elevated to the Diocese of Cuiaba on July 15, 1826. In 1868, underwent a reformation that altered the tower and the facade, was again modified in the 1920s, while at the same time the second tower was built. On April 5, 1910, the diocese was elevated to archdiocese.

With the prevalent idea of modernization in the 1960s, the decision was made to demolish it, which occurred on August 14, 1968, only after several charges of dynamite, an act that was remembered and lamented for several years. In place of the old church, a new church was constructed, of reinforced concrete. Work began at the back by the chancel, even before the complete demolition of the old church, and the new church was inaugurated on May 24, 1973. It was declared a minor basilica on November 15, 1974.

See also
Roman Catholicism in Brazil

References

Notes

Sources 

 
 
 
 
 
 
 

Roman Catholic cathedrals in Brazil
Roman Catholic churches completed in 1973
Basilica churches in Brazil
Roman Catholic churches in Mato Grosso
20th-century Roman Catholic church buildings in Brazil